Ruan Botha (born 10 January 1992) is a South African rugby union player. He plays as a lock for Kubota Spears in the Japanese Top League. He made his provincial debut on 31 March 2012 as the Golden Lions thrashed the Griffons 71–25 in Johannesburg. Botha started the match before being replaced in the 62nd minute by Hendrik Roodt.

His first call-up to the Lions Super Rugby team came ahead of the side's Australian tour during the 2012 Super Rugby season. He made the starting fifteen for the first time in the match against the Chiefs in Pukekohe on 5 May 2012.

Botha was named in the South Africa Under 20 team that won the 2012 IRB Junior World Championship.

He joined  for the 2013 season.

In May 2019, following three years with  he signed for English Premiership Rugby side London Irish on a initial 6 month contract. He was due to return to Irish following the 2019–20 Top League season in Japan which he would spend with Kubota Spears. However, in July 2020 London Irish confirmed he would not be returning.

References

External links

itsrugby.co.uk profile
IRB profile

Living people
1992 births
South African rugby union players
Golden Lions players
Lions (United Rugby Championship) players
Western Province (rugby union) players
Stormers players
Afrikaner people
Rugby union locks
People from Brakpan
South Africa Under-20 international rugby union players
Rugby union players from Gauteng
Sharks (Currie Cup) players
Sharks (rugby union) players
Kubota Spears Funabashi Tokyo Bay players
London Irish players